Atraphaxis is a genus of flowering plants in the family Polygonaceae with about 40 species.

Description
Species of Atraphaxis are much branched woody plants, forming shrubs or shrubby tufts. The current year's branchlets are herbaceous and bear the leaves and flowers. The leaves are simple and alternate, with very short stalks (almost sessile). The ochreas are membranous and usually two-veined, more-or-less joined at the base. The inflorescence is made up of several bundles (fascicles) of one to three flowers. The flowers have persistent tepals, either arranged in a narrow tube with unequal lobes or bell-shaped with equal segments. The fruits are wingless achenes.

Taxonomy
The genus Atraphaxis was erected by Carl Linnaeus in 1753. As with many other genera in the family Polygonaceae, the boundaries between the genera have been unclear, and some or all species placed in other genera. Molecular phylogenetic studies have shown that Atraphaxis forms a distinct clade. The genus is placed in the tribe Polygoneae of the subfamily Polygonoideae. Within the tribe, it is most closely related to the genera Duma and Polygonum, forming the so-called "DAP clade".

Species
, Plants of the World Online accepted 41 species:

Atraphaxis angustifolia Jaub. & Spach
Atraphaxis ariana (Grigorj.) T.M.Schust. & Reveal
Atraphaxis arida (Boiss. & Hausskn.) S.Tavakkoli & Kaz.Osaloo
Atraphaxis atraphaxiformis (Botsch.) T.M.Schust. & Reveal
Atraphaxis aucheri Jaub. & Spach
Atraphaxis avenia Botsch.
Atraphaxis badghysi Kult.
Atraphaxis billardierei Jaub. & Spach
Atraphaxis binaludensis S.Tavakkoli, Mozaff. & Kaz.Osaloo
Atraphaxis botuliformis (Mozaff.) S.Tavakkoli & Mozaff.
Atraphaxis bracteata Losinsk.
Atraphaxis canescens Bunge
Atraphaxis caucasica (Hoffm.) Pavlov
Atraphaxis compacta Ledeb.
Atraphaxis daghestanica (Lovelius) Lovelius
Atraphaxis decipiens Jaub. & Spach
Atraphaxis dumosa (Boiss.) S.Tavakkoli & Kaz.Osaloo
Atraphaxis frutescens (L.) K.Koch
Atraphaxis grandiflora Willd.
Atraphaxis intricata Mozaff.
Atraphaxis irtyschensis Chang Y.Yang & Y.L.Han
Atraphaxis kamelinii Yurtseva
Atraphaxis karataviensis Pavlov & Lipsch.
Atraphaxis kermanica S.Tavakkoli & Kaz.Osaloo
Atraphaxis khajeh-jamali (Khosravi & Poormahdi) S.Tavakkoli & Kaz.Osaloo
Atraphaxis kopetdagensis Kovalevsk.
Atraphaxis laetevirens (Ledeb.) Jaub. & Spach
Atraphaxis macrocarpa Rech.f. & Schiman-Czeika
Atraphaxis manshurica Kitag.
Atraphaxis muschketowii Krasn.
Atraphaxis popovii (Borodina) Yurtseva
Atraphaxis pungens (M.Bieb.) Jaub. & Spach
Atraphaxis pyrifolia Bunge
Atraphaxis radkanensis S.Tavakkoli, Kaz.Osaloo & Mozaff.
Atraphaxis rodinii Botsch.
Atraphaxis salicornioides (Jaub. & Spach) S.Tavakkoli & Kaz.Osaloo
Atraphaxis seravschanica Pavlov
Atraphaxis spinosa L.
Atraphaxis suaedifolia Jaub. & Spach
Atraphaxis teretifolia (Popov) Kom.
Atraphaxis toktogulica (Lazkov) T.M.Schust. & Reveal

References

Polygonoideae
Polygonaceae genera